Tapinoma gibbosum is a species of ant in the genus Tapinoma. Described by Stitz in 1933, the species is endemic to Brazil.

References

Tapinoma
Hymenoptera of South America
Insects described in 1933